William Hill Polygonal Barn, also known as the Hill-Mershon Barn, is an eight-sided barn located at Bloomingdale, Parke County, Indiana. It was built about 1905, and is a two-story, octagonal frame building.  It measures 30 feet in width and is topped by a sectional cone roof topped by an octagonal cupola.

It was added to the National Register of Historic Places in 1993.

References

Octagon barns in the United States
Barns on the National Register of Historic Places in Indiana
Buildings and structures completed in 1905
Buildings and structures in Parke County, Indiana
National Register of Historic Places in Parke County, Indiana
1905 establishments in Indiana